William Arthur (Jack) Little (March 12, 1891 – July 27, 1961) was a Major League Baseball outfielder. In 3 career games, he had 3 hits in 12 at-bats. He batted and threw right-handed.

He attended Baylor University.

Little was born in Mart, Texas and died in Dallas, Texas.

External links
Baseball Reference.com page

1891 births
1961 deaths
New York Highlanders players
Major League Baseball outfielders
Baseball players from Texas
Hartford Senators players
People from Mart, Texas